These bowl games and venues will host College Football Playoff semifinal and championship games. The Rose Bowl will always be played at 5:00 PM ET, and the Sugar Bowl will follow at 8:45 PM ET.  When played as a semifinal games, Orange, Cotton, Fiesta, and Peach bowls will be played at either 4:00 or 8:00 PM ET.

Games

Performance by team

Most common matchups

References

College Football Playoff